Nils Erik Adam Larsson (born 12 November 1992) is a Swedish professional ice hockey defenceman and alternate captain for the Seattle Kraken of the National Hockey League (NHL). He was selected fourth overall by the New Jersey Devils in the 2011 NHL Entry Draft. The youngest player on the Skellefteå AIK squad at the time of his draft, Larsson was the first defenceman and first European-trained player to be drafted in 2011.

Professional career

Skellefteå AIK (2009–2011)
The 2009–10 Elitserien season turned out to be a spectacular breakthrough season for Larsson. He scored two goals in an Elitserien game against Timrå IK on 15 October 2009. By the end of the season, Larsson had tied the single-season record for the number of points in Elitserien among defencemen under age 18 with 17 points, a record that was set by Tomas Jonsson in 1977–78, who compiled 8 goals and 9 assists in 35 games.

Larsson fought Timrå IK forward Daniel Corso in a game on 2 November 2010, receiving a cut eyebrow during the altercation. Larsson commented that he kept his gloves on because removing them during a fight in the Elitserien leads to an automatic one-game suspension. Although Larsson did not remove his gloves, both he and Corso were suspended for two games and received fines as a result of the fight.

Larsson's play in the 2010–11 season earned him a nomination for the Elitserien Rookie of the Year award, which Mattias Ekholm would eventually win.

New Jersey Devils (2011–2016)
Larsson was selected in the first round, fourth overall, by the New Jersey Devils in the 2011 NHL Entry Draft. Seen as a move towards rebuilding the Devil's defence corps, Larsson was rated by the NHL Central Scouting Bureau as the top European-based prospect available in the draft. Larsson signed a three-year, entry-level contract with no bonuses at the NHL maximum of US$925,000 per year with the Devils on 15 July 2011, due to general manager Lou Lamoriello's disapproval of performance bonuses. Larsson’s agent J.P. Barry said this was unusual for a top-10 draft pick. After making the team following the Devil's training camp, Larsson became the first 18-year-old defenceman to dress for the Devils since Petr Sykora in the 1995-96 season. He also became the sixth under-20 defenceman to play for the Devils, and the first 18-year-old defenceman in the NHL since 2008, when Drew Doughty, Zach Bogosian and Luke Schenn all made their NHL debuts. Upon making his NHL debut, Larsson averaged 24 minutes per game alongside defensemen Andy Greene and Henrik Tallinder. Despite failing to tally a point through his first nine games, Larsson was praised by Greene for his puck handling and poise. Shortly after his 19th birthday, Larsson scored his first career NHL goal in the first period of an eventual 3–1 loss to the Washington Capitals on 11 November. By mid-November, Larsson had accumulated six points while playing 22:49 per game as one of the Devil's top defencemen. At the same time, he also tied a team rookie defenseman record by collecting points in five straight games between November 19 and 26. Despite missing two games in late December to attend his grandmother's funeral, Larsson led all rookie defensemen with two goals and 11 assists for 13 points.

Due to his play during the first three months of the season, Larsson was selected to the NHL All-Star Rookie SuperSkills Competition on 12 January 2012, along with teammate Adam Henrique. At the time of the selection, Larsson led all rookie defensemen with 13 assists and 15 points while averaging 21:46 of ice time per game. However, he chose to pull out due to a sore wrist and was replaced by Montreal Canadiens rookie defenceman Raphael Diaz. Through his first 48 games in the NHL, Larsson averaged 21:48 minutes per games and had accumulated two goals and 14 assists while training with Devil's assistant coach Larry Robinson. His production was cut short after he suffered an injury on 2 February due to a hit from Canadiens defenseman P.K. Subban. Although he missed 10 games to recover, Larsson returned to the Devil's lineup still leading all Devils defensemen in points. However, he only scored two assists through the final 16 games and he served as a healthy scratch for five of the team's last six regular season games. He finished the regular season with two goals and 16 assists through 65 games and received one fifth-place vote for the Calder Memorial Trophy. Beyond his point total, Larsson played an average of 26 seconds per game on the penalty kill, while averaging 1:38 on the power play. Despite his success during the regular season, Larsson struggled to enter the Devil's lineup in the 2012 Stanley Cup playoffs as he failed to make an appearance during their opening-round matchup against the Florida Panthers. He eventually made his postseason debut in Game 2 of the Eastern Conference semifinals against the Philadelphia Flyers after Ilya Kovalchuk suffered an injury. During his debut, he recorded five hits through 13 minutes and 15 seconds of ice time as well as tallied the game-tying goal in their eventual 4–1 win. Upon scoring the game-tying goal, Larsson also became the first Devils rookie defenceman to score a goal in his first playoff game. Due to his debut, Larsson remained in the Devil's lineup for Game 3 despite Kovalchuk returning. He played in four more playoff games, going pointless through all, before being replaced by Peter Harrold prior to Game 2 of the Eastern Conference finals against the New York Rangers.

Following their rookie seasons, Larsson and Henrique were assigned to the Devils American Hockey League (AHL) affiliate, the Albany Devils, prior to the start of the 2012–13 season. Due to the 2012–13 NHL lockout, numerous other NHL players opted to join the AHL while the NHL Collective Bargaining Agreement was under talks. Larsson tallied four goals and 15 assists in 33 games with Albany before making his season debut on 31 January 2013 in place of Mark Fayne. He had joined the team for five games prior to that but sat out as a healthy scratch. Upon rejoining the team, he was again paired with Greene and saw increased time on the Devil's penalty kill. As the Devils failed to qualify for the 2013 Stanley Cup playoffs, Larsson had recorded six assists and a plus-4 rating through 37 games while also averaging 18:06 of ice time per game. Despite going goalless, Larsson would use his body effectively on the ice as he finished sixth on the team in hits and fifth in blocked shots.

Unlike the previous season, Larsson made the Devils' opening night roster prior to the start of the 2013–14 season. 
After suffering a lower-body injury on 23 November 2013 during a game against the San Jose Sharks, Larsson was placed on injured reserve. At the time, he had one goal and two assists through his first 20 games of the season. He did not skate for the first few weeks but began skating lightly after three weeks of rest. However, he suffered a setback while rehabbing and his knee locked up again. This resulted in a longer recovery period than originally predicted. He returned to the ice after missing 21 games and was immediately re-assigned to the AHL to work on his conditioning. He remained with the Albany Devils for 32 games before being recalled back to the NHL level on 31 March. At the time of the recall, he was second among team defensemen in scoring with three goals and 16 assists for 19 points. Despite his return to the NHL lineup, the Devils failed to qualify for the Stanley Cup playoffs for the third consecutive season.

Larsson made his 2014–15 season season debut on 21 October but served as a healthy scratch until 30 October. He later missed 10 games starting from 2 December while recovering from the mumps. Upon recovering, he was re-assigned to the Albany Devils for a conditioning stint on 19 December. After tallying two assists in Albany, he returned to the NHL lineup on 23 December. Following the 2014–15 season, Larsson became a restricted free agent under the NHL Collective Bargaining Agreement (CBA). The Devils made him a qualifying offer to retain his NHL rights and on 5 July 2015, he filed for salary arbitration under the CBA. On 25 July, he signed a six-year, $25 million contract with an average annual value of $4,166,667 to remain with the Devils.

Edmonton Oilers (2016–2021)
On 29 June 2016, Larsson was traded to the Edmonton Oilers in exchange for Taylor Hall. The trade was immediately met with derision and shock from hockey pundits who felt that the trade was lopsided in favor of the Devils. Oilers President and General Manager Peter Chiarelli defended the trade, saying: "(Larsson) is a younger player, not by much, by a year. It’s a need-based trade. I feel very strongly about this player. I think he’s only scratched the surface. He was really excited when I talked to him. He felt the same thing." Prior to the start of the 2016–17 season, Chiarelli also added Milan Lucic, Patrick Maroon, and Zack Kassian to the Oilers lineup. Through the preseason and exhibition games, Larsson played on the Oilers’ top pairing with fellow countryman Oscar Klefbom. This continued into the regular season and the pair continued to compliment each other throughout the campaign as they grew more confident in their defensive capabilities. In this new role, they helped the Oilers start the season with a 7–2–1 record and a .750 points percentage that ranks second to the Montreal Canadiens through their first ten games. Although Larsson only tallied three points while averaging 20:19 of ice time through 16 games, coach Todd McLellan praised him for being a "stabilizing factor" on the blue line. By late December, Larsson and the Oilers were contending for first place in the Pacific Division with an 18–12–6 record. As a member of the Oiler's top defensive pairing, Larsson had tallied two goals and four assists through 36 games and was tied for eighth in the NHL in hits with 106. Due to an injury to defencemen Darnell Nurse, Larsson was praised as being the Oiler's most physical blueliner.

Through the second half of the season, Larsson and Klefbom continued to hold a strong presence as the Oiler's top defensive pairing. Despite missing numerous games to recover from an injury in February, Larsson finished second on the team in even-strength minutes per game (18:22) and plus-minus (21). Klefbom credited Larsson for helping him evolve into a more complete defenceman as he compiled career highs in goals and points. Meanwhile, Larsson finished the season with four goals and 15 assists for 19 points through 79 games. As the Oilers faced the San Jose Sharks in the 2017 Stanley Cup playoffs, Larsson and Klefbom were often charged with covering the Sharks captain Joe Pavelski. They eventually beat the Sharks in six games and met the Anaheim Ducks in the Western Conference Second Round. Larsson played an important role in their second round, despite the team failing to qualify for the Western Conference Final. In Game 1 against the Ducks, Larsson scored two goals in 7½ minutes of the third period to lift the Oilers to a 5–3 win. During the Oilers 4–3 double-overtime loss in Game 5, Larrson logged a team-high 44:58 minutes of ice time as he was one of two Oilers blueliners who didn't miss a shift due to an injury examination. The Oilers eventually fell to the Ducks in Game 7. Larsson finished the postseason with two goals and four assists through 13 games.

Prior to the start of the 2017–18 season, Larsson became the first Swede in franchise history to be named an alternate captain for the Oilers. Due to injuries throughout the lineup, Larsson spent the 2017–18 season playing with Klefbom or Nurse on the Oiler's top line. Klefbom and Larsson played 208 minutes together 5-on-5 while maintaining 53 percent possession and 39 percent of the goal share. Meanwhile, Nurse and Larsson played 819 minutes together 5-on-5 while maintaining 51 percent possession and 56 percent of the goal share. Larsson began the season strong, tallying three goals and one assist through his first 25 games, before being placed on Injured Reserve due to an upper-body injury on 1 December. The Oilers posted a 4–4–0 record over Larsson's injury stint before he returned to the lineup on 18 December. Larsson missed more games during the season following his father's cardiac arrest on 25 January. He missed eight games directly following his father's death, played in seven when funeral arrangements were pending, and then missed another two to return to Sweden for the funeral. After returning to the Oilers lineup, Larsson tallied his 100th NHL point in a 3–2 win over the Los Angeles Kings on 24 March. He subsequently finished the season with four goals and 12 points through 57 games. As a result of his personal struggles during the 2017–18 season, Larsson was the Oilers nominee for the Bill Masterton Memorial Trophy as a player who most exemplifies "perseverance, sportsmanship and dedication to hockey."

During the 2018 NHL off season, Larsson won a gold medal with Team Sweden at the 2018 IIHF World Championship. Larsson returned to the Oilers for the 2018–19 preseason but suffered a back injury during an exhibition game against the Calgary Flames. He subsequently missed two exhibition games with back tightness but returned to the ice for the Oiler's season opener in Gothenburg, Sweden.  Larsson was immediately reconnected with Klefbom as the Oiler's top defensive pairing before the latter suffered an injury in late December. As well, the Oilers losing record of 10-10–1 to begin the season resulted in head coach Todd McLellan being replaced with Ken Hitchcock. Following the injury to Klefbom, Nurse joined Larsson as the Oiler's top defensive pair. The two had previously played 15 games together during Klefbom's previous injury in the 2017–18 season. However, following the return of Kris Russell, Larsson gained rookie Caleb Jones as his new defensive partner. Prior to being returned to the AHL, Jones played 133 minutes of ice time with Larsson while they averaged 5-11 goals for the team. As Larsson struggle without Klefbom in the lineup, so did the team who were seventh in the Pacific Division with 52 points in mid-January. As such, Peter Chiarelli was fired as president of hockey operations and general manager of the Oilers. Although Larsson finished the season with 17 assists and 20 points through all 82 games, the Oilers failed to qualify for the 2019 Stanley Cup playoffs.

During the 2019 offseason, Larsson endured a different training regime to become quicker on the ice and returned to the Oilers lineup down 10 pounds. After blocking a shot during the Oiler's 2019–20 season opener against the Vancouver Canucks, Larsson was placed on long-term injured reserve with a fractured right fibula. He returned to the Oilers lineup in November after missing 22 games to recover. Upon returning to the ice, he was reunited with Klefbom and the two played over 500 minutes of ice time together before the NHL was paused due to the COVID-19 pandemic. At the time of the pause in March, he had tallied one goal and five assists through 49 games.

Seattle Kraken (2021–present)
On 21 July 2021, Larsson was selected from the Oilers at the 2021 NHL Expansion Draft by the Seattle Kraken. He was immediately signed to a four-year, $16 million contract by the Kraken. It was later revealed that one of the reasons he had left the Oilers was due to the trauma of his father's death. He had been informed of his father's cardiac arrest while on the practice ice with the Oilers and, as such, found it "tough to come back." Prior to the start of the 2021–22 NHL season, Larsson, Jordan Eberle, Yanni Gourde, and Jaden Schwartz were named the four alternative captains for the Kraken. He began the season strong, tallying 14 shots on goal in his first 10 games, while on a defensive pairing with Jeremy Lauzon. Larsson's play in high-risk situations subsequently earned him praise from Kraken coach Dave Hakstol, who described him as a measured professional who is a warrior for the team. He continued to be an asset for the Kraken on the penalty kill as he led the team with 52 minutes of ice time while shorthanded by early December. However, later that month, the Kraken were forced to postpone numerous games due to ongoing coronavirus concerns. Larson was one of numerous Kraken players added to the teams' COVID-19 protocol list within one week in mid-December.

Larsson missed 10 days to recover from COVID-19 but immediately joined the team for their 3–2 loss against the Flyers on 29 December. Despite missing significant playing time and lacking a full practice, Larsson led all Seattle skaters with 22:38 of ice time. He continued to improve offensively through January as he scored in back-to-back games for the first time in his NHL career. He also scored the first overtime game-winning goal in franchise history on 26 January to lead the Kraken over the Pittsburgh Penguins. Once Giordano and Lauzon were dealt at the NHL trade deadline, Larsson and Vince Dunn became consistent defensive partners for the remainder of the season. He finished the season with a career-high 25 points through 81 games while also recording 183 hits, 140 blocked shots, 119 shots on net, and a minus-21 rating.

Prior to the start of the 2022–23 NHL season, Larsson was again named one of four alternative captains for the Kraken alongside Eberle, Gourde, and Schwartz. He immediately reunited with Dunn as his defensive partner. Larsson played in his 700th career NHL game in a 1–0 loss to the Minnesota Wild on 11 November 2022. By December, Larsson had accumulated two goals and five assists while playing with Dunn as they helped the Kraken have 53.7% of unblocked shot attempts during games. The following month, Larsson tied Eberle for the longest points streak in franchise history by scoring a goal and six assists through seven consecutive games. Their franchise record was beaten later in the month by Dunn after he maintained an eight game streak.

International play

Larsson represented Sweden at the 2010 World Junior Championships, held in Saskatoon and Regina, Saskatchewan. At the 2010 World U18 Championships, he was selected as the best defenceman of the tournament. When Larsson played for Sweden at the 2011 World Junior Championships, he repeated his scoring of one goal and three assists from the previous tournament, which earned him the distinction of being Sweden's highest-scoring defenceman at the tournament.

Larsson represented the Sweden senior team at the 2018 IIHF World Championship held in Denmark.

Personal life
Larsson's father, Robert Larsson, played 249 games with Skellefteå AIK from 1985 to 1995. Robert Larsson was drafted in the sixth round, 112th overall, by the Los Angeles Kings during the 1988 NHL Entry Draft, but never played in North America.

In the 2008–09 season, Larsson played with his older brother Hampus in the J20 SuperElit, Sweden's junior league.

Career statistics

Regular season and playoffs

International

Notable awards and honors
 2010 IIHF World U18 Championships All-Star Team

References

External links

1992 births
Living people
Albany Devils players
Edmonton Oilers players
Swedish expatriate ice hockey players in Canada
Swedish expatriate ice hockey players in the United States
National Hockey League first-round draft picks
New Jersey Devils draft picks
New Jersey Devils players
People from Skellefteå Municipality
Seattle Kraken players
Skellefteå AIK players
Swedish ice hockey defencemen
Sportspeople from Västerbotten County